The genetic history of the Middle East is the subject of research within the fields of human population genomics, archaeogenetics and Middle Eastern studies. Researchers use Y-DNA, mtDNA, and other autosomal DNAs to identify the genetic history of ancient and modern populations of Egypt,  Persia, Mesopotamia, Anatolia, Arabia, the Levant, and other areas.

History

Developments in DNA sequencing in the 1970s and 1980s provided researchers with the tools needed to study human genetic variation and the genetics of human populations to discover founder populations of modern people groups and human migrations.

In 2005, National Geographic launched The Genographic Project, led by 12 prominent scientists and researchers, to study and map historical human migration patterns by collecting and analyzing DNA samples from hundreds of thousands of people from around the world.

Egypt 

Various DNA studies have found that the genetic variant frequencies of North African populations are intermediate between those of the Near East, the Horn of Africa, Southern Europe and Sub Saharan Africa.

A study by Luis et al (2004) performed on a sample of 147 modern Egyptians found that the male haplogroups are E1b1b (36.1%, predominantly E-M78), J (32.0%), G (8.8%), T (8.2%), and R (7.5%). The study found that "Egypt's NRY frequency distributions appear to be much more similar to those of the Middle East than to any sub-Saharan African population, suggesting a much larger Eurasian genetic component ... The cumulative frequency of typical sub-Saharan lineages (A, B, E1, E2, E3a, and E3b*) is 9% in Egypt ... whereas the haplogroups of Eurasian origin (Groups C, D, and F–Q) account for 59% [in Egypt]". Cruciani et al. (2007) suggests that E-M78, E1b1b predominant subclade in Egypt, originated in "Northeastern Africa", with a corridor for bidirectional migrations between northeastern and eastern Africa (at least 2 episodes between 23.9–17.3 ky and 18.0–5.9 ky ago), trans-Mediterranean migrations directly from northern Africa to Europe (mainly in the last 13.0 ky), and flow from northeastern Africa to western Asia between 20.0 and 6.8 ky ago. Also, the authors identified the frequency of the E-M78 subclade among modern-day populations in the Northeastern African region, which in the study referred to sample groups in Libya and Egypt. Cruciani et al also proposed that E-M35, the parent clade of E-M78, originated in East Africa during the Palaeolithic and subsequently spread to the region of Egypt.

A 2004 mtDNA study of 58 upper Egyptian individuals included 34 individuals from Gurna, a small settlement on the hills opposite Luxor. The 34 individuals from Gurna exhibited the haplogroups: M1 (6/34 individuals, 17.6%), H (5/34 individuals, 14.7%), L1a (4/34 individuals, 11.8%) and U (3/34 individuals, 8.8%). The M1 haplotype frequency in Gurna individuals (6/34 individuals, 17.6%) is similar to that seen in Ethiopian population (20%), along with a West Eurasian component different in haplogroup distribution in the Gurna individuals. However, the M1 haplotypes from Gurna individuals exhibited a mutation that is not present in Ethiopian population; whereas this mutation was present in non-M1 haplotype individuals from Gurna. Nile Valley Egyptians do not show the characteristics that were shown by the Gurna individuals. The results of the study suggested that the sample of Gurna individuals had retained elements of an ancestral genetic structure from an ancestral East African population, characterized by a high M1 haplogroup frequency. Another 2004 mtDNA study featured the Gurna individuals samples, and clustered them together with the Ethiopian and Yemeni groups, in between the Near Eastern and other African sample groups.

A study by Arredi et al., which analyzed 275 samples from five populations in Algeria, Tunisia, and Egypt, as well as published data from Moroccan populations, suggests that the North African pattern of Y-chromosomal variation, including in Egypt, is largely of Neolithic origin. The study analyzed North African populations, including North Egyptians and South Egyptians, as well as samples from Southern Europe, the Middle East, and sub-Saharan Africa, and revealed the following conclusions about the male-lineage variation in North Africa: "The lineages that are most prevalent in North Africa are distinct from those in the regions to the immediate north and south: Europe and sub-Saharan Africa ... two haplogroups predominate within North Africa, together making up almost two-thirds of the male lineages: E3b2 and J* (42% and 20%, respectively). E3b2 is rare outside North Africa, and is otherwise known only from Mali, Niger, and Sudan to the immediate south, and the Near East and Southern Europe at very low frequencies. Haplogroup J reaches its highest frequencies in the Middle East".

Keita (2008) examined a published Y-chromosome dataset on Afro-Asiatic populations and found that a key lineage E-M35/E-M78, sub-clade of haplogroup E, was shared between the populations in the locale of original Egyptian speakers and modern Cushitic speakers from the Horn. These lineages are present in Egyptians, Berbers, Cushitic speakers from the Horn of Africa, and Semitic speakers in the Near-East. He noted that variants are also found in the Aegean and Balkans, but the origin of the M35 subclade was in East Africa, and its clades were dominant in a core portion of Afro-Asiatic speaking populations which included Cushitic, Egyptian and Berber groups, in contrast Semitic speakers showed a decline in frequency going west to east in the Levantine-Syria region. Keita identified high frequencies of M35 (>50%) among Omotic populations, but stated that this derived from a small, published sample of 12. Keita also wrote that the PN2 mutation was shared by M35 and M2 lineages and this defined clade originated from East Africa. He concluded that "the genetic data give population profiles that clearly indicate males of African origin, as opposed to being of Asian or European descent" but acknowledged that the biodiversity does not indicate any specific set of skin colors or facial features as populations were subject to microevolutionary pressures. 

A study by Hollfelder et al. (2017) analyzed various populations and found that Copts and Egyptians showed low levels of genetic differentiation and lower levels of genetic diversity compared to the northeast African groups. Copts and Egyptians displayed similar levels of European/Middle Eastern ancestry (Copts were estimated to be of 69.54% ± 2.57 European ancestry, and the Egyptians of 70.65% ± 2.47 European ancestry). The study concluded that the Copts and the Egyptians have a common history linked to smaller population sizes, and that the behavior in the admixture analyses is consistent with shared ancestry between Copts and Egyptians and/or additional genetic drift in the Copts.

A genetic study published in the "European Journal of Human Genetics" (2019) found that Northern Africans (including Egyptians) from a global population sample of 164 were closely related to Europeans and West Asians as well as to Southwest Asians. However, the authors acknowledged that the results of the study, which featured the 55 AINSP panel, would have further weight if further extensive population studies from Morocco, Tunisia and Egypt were obtained as only nine population samples were included to represent the North African region.

Ancient Egyptians 
Contamination from handling and intrusion from microbes create obstacles to the recovery of Ancient DNA. Consequently, most DNA studies have been carried out on modern Egyptian populations with the intent of learning about the influences of historical migrations on the population of Egypt. However, DNA grouping methods and classifications have attracted criticism in the view of some scholars for excluding data on African populations. S.O.Y. Keita, a biological anthropologist, argued in 2022 that genetic studies should be interpreted in a framework with other sources of evidence and also observes that sometimes the interpretation of data 
in genetic studies betrays a "default racialist or racist approach". Barry Kemp has noted that DNA studies could only provide firm conclusions about the population of Ancient Egypt if the sample results featured a significant number of individuals, which represented a broad geographical and chronological range.

In 1993, a study was performed on ancient mummies of the 12th Dynasty, which identified multiple lines of descent, some of which originated from Sub-Saharan Africa but other lineages were not identified.

In 2012 the 20th dynasty mummies of Ramesses III and another mummy "Unknown Man E" believed to be Ramesses III's son Pentawer were analyzed by Albert Zink, Yehia Z Gad and a team of researchers under Zahi Hawass, then Secretary General of the Supreme Council of Antiquities, Egypt. Genetic kinship analyses revealed identical haplotypes in both mummies using the Whit Athey's haplogroup predictor, the Y chromosomal haplogroup E1b1a (E-M2) was predicted.

In 2013, Nature announced the publication of the first genetic study utilizing next-generation sequencing to ascertain the ancestral lineage of an Ancient Egyptian individual. The research was led by Carsten Pusch of the University of Tübingen in Germany and Rabab Khairat, who released their findings in the Journal of Applied Genetics. DNA was extracted from the heads of five Egyptian mummies that were housed at the institution. All the specimens were dated between 806 BC and 124 AD, a timeframe corresponding with the late Dynastic period. The researchers observed that one of the mummified individuals likely belonged to the mtDNA haplogroup I2, a maternal clade that is believed to have originated in Western Asia.

In a 2017 study published in Nature, three ancient Egyptian mummies were obtained spanning around 1,300 years of Egyptian history from the late New Kingdom to the Roman period. The study used 135 modern Egyptian samples. Two of the three ancient Egyptians were assigned to haplogroup J and one to haplogroup E1b1b1 both are carried by modern Egyptians. Analyses of the ancient Egyptian samples revealed higher affinities with near eastern populations compared to modern Egyptians, likely due to an 8% increase in African component which occurred predominantly within the last 2000 years. "Genetic continuity between ancient and modern Egyptians cannot be ruled out despite this more recent sub-Saharan African influx, while continuity with modern Ethiopians is not supported." The authors noted that the ancient Egyptian samples were obtained from one site and may not be representative for all of ancient Egypt. They stated that more genetic studies on mummified remains from southern Egypt and Sudan would be needed to reach a conclusive view. Gourdine, Anselin and Keita criticised the methodology of the Scheunemann et al study and argued that the Sub-Saharan "genetic affinities" may be attributed to "early settlers" and "the relevant Sub-Saharan genetic markers" do not correspond with the geography of known trade routes". In 2022, Danielle Candelora criticised the Schuenemann study for its “untested” methodology, limited sample sizes and “problematic comparative” data which she argued served to legitimise racist conceptions of ancient civilizations with “scientific evidence”.

In 2018, the tomb of  two high-status Egyptians, Nakht-Ankh and Khnum-Nakht was discovered by Sir William Flinders Petrie and Ernest Mackay in 1907. Nakht-Ankh and Khnum-Nakht lived during the 12th Dynasty (1985–1773 BCE) in Middle Egypt and were aged 20 years apart. Their tomb was completely undisturbed prior to its excavation. Each mummy has a different physical morphology and in the DNA analysis by the University of Manchester differences between the Y chromosome SNPs indicate different paternal lineages concluding that Nakht-Ankh and Khnum-Nakht were half-brothers but Y chromosome sequences were not complete enough to determine paternal haplogroup. The SNP identities were consistent with mtDNA haplogroup M1a1 with 88.05–91.27% degree of confidence, thus confirming the African origins of the two individuals.

In 2020 Yehia Z Gad and other researchers of the Hawass team published results of an analysis of the mitochondrial and Y-chromosomal haplogroups of several mummies of 18th Dynasty Including Tutankhamun in the journal Human Molecular Genetics, Volume 30, Issue R1, 1 March 2021, Pages R24–R28, Results were used to provide information about the phylogenetic groups of his family members and their presence among the reported contemporary Egyptian population  data. The analysis confirmed previous data of the Tutankhamun's ancestry with  multiple  controls  authenticating  all  results. However, the specific clade of R1b was not determined and the profiles for Tutankhamun and Amenhotep III were incomplete, the analysis produced differing probability figures despite having concordant allele results. Because the relationships of these two mummies with the KV55 mummy had previously been confirmed in an earlier study, the haplogroup prediction of both mummies could be derived from the full profile of the KV55 data. The  proposed  sibling  relationship between Tutankhamun's parents, Akhenaten and the mummy known as the "younger lady" (KV35YL) is  further  supported.

In 2010 Hawass et al undertook detailed anthropological, radiological, and genetic studies as part of the King Tutankhamun Family Project. The objectives included attempting to determine familial relationships among 11 royal mummies of the New Kingdom, as well to research for pathological features including potential inherited disorders and infectious diseases. In 2012, Hawass et al undertook an anthropological, forensic, radiological, and genetic study of the 20th dynasty mummies of Ramesses III and an unknown man which were found together. In 2022, S.O.Y. Keita analysed 8 Short Tandem loci (STR) data published as part of these studies by Hawass et al, using an algorithm that only has three choices: Eurasians, sub-Saharan Africans, and East Asians. Using these three options, Keita concluded that the studies showed "a majority to have an affinity with "sub-Saharan" Africans in one affinity analysis". However, Keita cautioned that this does not mean that the royal mummies “lacked other affiliations” which he argued had been obscured in typological thinking. Keita further added that different “data and algorithms might give different results” which reflects the complexity of biological heritage and the associated interpretation.

Blood typing and DNA sampling on ancient Egyptian mummies is scant; however, a 1982 study of blood typing of dynastic mummies found ABO frequencies to be most similar to modern Egyptians and some also to Northern Haratin populations. ABO blood group distribution shows that the Egyptians form a sister group to North African populations, including Berbers, Nubians and Canary Islanders.

Iran

Links to Chalcolithic Anatolia 
A 2017 study analyzed the autosomal DNA and genome of an Iron Age Iranian sample taken from Teppe Hasanlu (F38_Hasanlu, dated to 971–832 BCE) and revealed it had close affinities to a Chalcolithic North-West Anatolian individual from Kumtepe even closer than Neolithic Iranians. This implies admixture took place between ancient populations of Iran and Anatolia.

Gilaks and Mazandaranis 

A 2006 genetic research was made by Nasidze et al. on the North Iranian populations on the Gilaks and Mazandaranis, spanning the southwestern coast of the Caspian Sea, up to the border with neighbouring Azerbaijan. The Gilaks and Mazandaranis comprise 7% of the Iranian population. The study suggested that their ancestors came from the Caucasus region, perhaps displacing an earlier group in the South Caspian. Linguistic evidence supports this scenario, in that the Gilaki and Mazandarani languages (but not other Iranian languages) share certain typological features with Caucasian languages, and specifically South Caucasian languages. There have been patterns analyzed of mtDNA and Y chromosome variation in the Gilaki and Mazandarani.

Based on mtDNA HV1 sequences tested by Nasidze et al., the Gilaks and Mazandarani most closely resemble their geographic and linguistic neighbors, namely other Iranian groups. However, their Y chromosome types most closely resemble those found in groups from the South Caucasus.
A scenario that explains these differences is a south Caucasian origin for the ancestors of the Gilani and Mazandarani, followed by introgression of women (but not men) from local Iranian groups, possibly because of patrilocality.
Given that both mtDNA and language are maternally transmitted, the incorporation of local Iranian women would have resulted in the concomitant replacement of the ancestral Caucasian language and mtDNA types of the Gilani and Mazandarani with their current Iranian language and mtDNA types. Concomitant replacement of language and mtDNA may be a more general phenomenon than previously recognized.

The Mazandarani and Gilani groups fall inside a major cluster consisting of populations from the Caucasus and West Asia and are particularly close to the South Caucasus groups—Georgians, Armenians, and Azerbaijanis. Iranians from Tehran and Isfahan are situated more distantly from these groups.

Iranian Azeris 

The 2013 comparative study on the complete mitochondrial DNA diversity in Iranians has indicated that Iranian Azerbaijanis are more related to the people of Georgia, than they are to other Iranians (Like Persians), while the Persians, Armenians and Qashqai on the other hand were more related to each other. It furthermore showed that overall, the complete mtDNA sequence analysis revealed an extremely high level of genetic diversity in the Iranian populations studied which is comparable to the other groups from the South Caucasus, Anatolia and Europe. The same 2013 research further noted that "the results of AMOVA and MDS analyses did not associate any regional and/or linguistic group of populations in the Anatolia, Caucasus and Iran region pointing to strong genetic affinity of Indo-European speaking Persians and Turkic-speaking Qashqais, thus suggesting their origin from a common maternal ancestral gene pool. The pronounced influence of the South Caucasus populations on the maternal diversity of Iranian Azeris is also evident from the MDS analysis results." The study also notes that "It is worth pointing out the position of Azeris from the Caucasus region, who despite their supposed common origin with Iranian Azeris, cluster quite separately and occupy an intermediate position between the Azeris/Georgians and Turks/Iranians grouping". The MtDNA results from the samples overall on average closely resemble those found in the neighbouring regions of the Caucasus, Anatolia, and to a lesser extent (Northern) Mesopotamia.

Among the most common MtDNA lineages in the nation, namely U3b3, appears to be restricted to populations of Iran and the Caucasus, while the sub-cluster U3b1a is common in the whole Near East region.

Iraq

Links to South Asia 

A 2013 study based on DNA extracted from the dental remains of four individuals from different time eras (200–300 CE, 2650–2450 BCE, 2200–1900 BCE) unearthed at Tell Ashara (ancient Terqa, in modern Syria) and Tell Masaikh (ancient Kar-Assurnasirpal) suggested a possible genetic link between the people of Bronze Age Mesopotamia and Northern India. According to the study, "We anticipate that the analyzed remains from [northern] Mesopotamia belonged to people with genetic affinity to the Indian subcontinent since the distribution of identified ancient haplotypes indicates solid link with populations from the region of South Asia-Tibet (Trans-Himalaya). They may have been descendants of migrants from much earlier times, spreading the clades of the macrohaplogroup M throughout Eurasia and founding regional Mesopotamian groups like that of Terqa or just merchants moving along trade routes passing near or through the region." A 2014 study expanding on the 2013 study and based on analysis of 15751 DNA samples arrives at the conclusion, that "M65a, M49 and/or M61 haplogroups carrying ancient Mesopotamians might have been the merchants from India".

Assyrians 

In the 1995 book The History and Geography of Human Genes the authors wrote that: "The Assyrians are a fairly homogeneous group of people, believed to originate from the land of old Assyria in northern Iraq [..] they are Christians and are bona fide descendants of their ancient namesakes." In a 2006 study of the Y chromosome DNA of six regional populations, including, for comparison, Assyrians and Syrians, researchers found that, "the two Semitic populations (Assyrians and Syrians) are very distinct from each other according to both [comparative] axes. This difference supported also by other methods of comparison points out the weak genetic affinity between the two populations with different historical destinies."

A 2008 study on the genetics of "old ethnic groups in Mesopotamia," including 340 subjects from seven ethnic communities ("These populations included Assyrians, Jews, Zoroastrians, Armenians, Arabs and Turkmen (representing ethnic groups from Iran, restricted by rules of their religion), and the Iraqi and Kuwaiti populations from Iraq and Kuwait.") found that Assyrians were homogeneous with respect to all other ethnic groups sampled in the study, regardless of religious affiliation.

Marsh Arabs 

A study published in 2011 looking at the relationship between Iraq's Marsh Arabs and ancient Sumerians concluded "the modern Marsh Arabs of Iraq harbour mtDNAs and Y chromosomes that are predominantly of Middle Eastern origin. Therefore, certain cultural features of the area such as water buffalo breeding and rice farming, which were most likely introduced from the Indian sub-continent, only marginally affected the gene pool of the autochthonous people of the region. Moreover, a Middle Eastern ancestral origin of the modern population of the marshes of southern Iraq implies that, if the Marsh Arabs are descendants of the ancient Sumerians, also Sumerians were not of Indian or Southern Asian ancestry." The same 2011 study, when focusing on the genetics of the Maʻdān people of Iraq, identified Y chromosome haplotypes shared by Marsh Arabs, Arabic speaking Iraqis, Assyrians and Mandeans  "supporting a common local background."

Levant

Chalcolithic and Bronze Age periods 
A 2018 study analyzed 22 out of the 600 people who were buried in Peki'in cave from the Chalcolithic Period, and found out these individuals harbored both local Levantine as well as Anatolian and Zagros-related ancestries. This group has peculiar phenotypical characteristics unseen in earlier Levantines, such as blue eyes.

A 2020 study published in Cell analyzed human remains from Chalcolithic Amuq valley as well as Bronze age cities of Ebla and Alalakh in the Levant. The Chalcolithic inhabitants of Tell Kurdu in Amuq valley were modeled as a mixture of Neolithic Levantine, Anatolian and Zagros-related ancestries. On the other hand, the inhabitants of Ebla and Alalakh required additional Chalcolithic-era Iranian and Southern Levantine ancestry next to their Chalcolithic Amuq valley, implying additional input during the Late Chalcolithic–Early Bronze age transition. The origins of the Bronze age groups in the Amuq valley remain debated, despite numerous designations at the time (e.g., Amorites, Hurrians, Palaeo-Syrians). One hypothesis associates the arrival of these groups with climate-forced population movement during the 4.2-kiloyear event, a Mega Drought that led to the abandonment of the entire Khabur river valley in Upper Mesopotamia in search of habitable areas.

Canaanites and Phoenicians 

Zalloua and Wells (2004), under the auspices of a  grant from National Geographic Magazine, examined the origins of the Canaanite Phoenicians. The debate between Wells and Zalloua was whether haplogroup J2 (M172) should be identified as that of the Phoenicians or that of its "parent" haplogroup M89 on the YDNA phylogenetic tree. 
Initial consensus suggested that J2 be identified with the Canaanite-Phoenician (North Levantine) population, with avenues open for future research. As Wells commented, "The Phoenicians were the Canaanites" It was reported in the PBS description of the National Geographic TV Special on this study entitled "Quest for the Phoenicians" that ancient DNA was included in this study as extracted from the tooth of a 2500-year-old Phoenician mummy. Wells identified the haplogroup of the Canaanites as haplogroup J2 which originated from Anatolia and the Caucasus.

Cyprus 

A 2016 study on 600 Cypriot males asserts that "genome-wide studies indicate that the genetic affinity of Cyprus is nearest to current populations of the Levant". Analyses of Cypriot haplogroup data are consistent with two stages of prehistoric settlement. E-V13 and E-M34 are widespread, and PCA suggests sourcing them to the Balkans and Levant/Anatolia, respectively. Contrasting haplogroups in the PCA were used as surrogates of parental populations. Admixture analyses suggested that the majority of G2a-P15 and R1b-M269 components were contributed by Anatolia and Levant sources, respectively, while Greece/Balkans supplied the majority of E-V13 and J2a-M67. Haplotype-based expansion times were at historical levels suggestive of recent demography. On the other hand, more recent Principal Component Analyses based on autosomal DNA, have placed Cypriots clearly separate from Levantine and Middle Eastern groups, either at the easternmost flank of the Southern European cluster, or in an intermediate position between Southern Europeans and northern Levantines. In a study by Harvard geneticist Iosif Lazarides and colleagues investigating the genetic origins of the Minoans and Mycenaeans, Cypriots were found to be the second least differentiated population from Bronze Age Mycenaeans based on FST index and also genetically differentiated from Levantines.

A 2017 study found that both Turkish Cypriots' and Greek Cypriots' patrilineal ancestry derives primarily from a single pre-Ottoman local gene pool. The frequency of total haplotypes shared between Turkish and Greek Cypriots is 7-8%, with analysis showing that none of these are found in Turkey, thus not supporting a Turkish origin for the shared haplotypes. No shared haplotypes were observed between Greek Cypriots and mainland Turkish populations, while total haplotypes shared between Turkish Cypriots and mainland Turks is 3%. Turkish Cypriots also share haplotypes with North Africans to a lesser extent, and have Eastern Eurasian haplogroups (H, C, N, O, Q) – attributed to the arrival of the Ottomans – at a frequency of ~5.5%. Both Cypriot groups show close genetic affinity to Calabrian (southern Italy) and Lebanese patrilineages. The study states that the genetic affinity between Calabrians and Cypriots can be explained as a result of a common ancient Greek (Achaean) genetic contribution, while Lebanese affinity can be explained through several migrations that took place from coastal Levant to Cyprus from the Neolithic (early farmers), the Iron Age (Phoenicians), and the Middle Ages (Maronites and other Levantine settlers during the Frankish era). The predominant haplogroups among both Turkish and Greek Cypriots are J2a-M410, E-M78, and G2-P287.

Israel and Palestine 

A study published by the National Academy of Sciences found that "the paternal gene pools of Jewish communities from Europe, North Africa, and the Middle East descended from a common Middle Eastern ancestral population", and suggested that "most Jewish communities have remained relatively isolated from neighbouring non-Jewish communities during and after the Jewish diaspora". According to geneticist Doron Behar and colleagues (2010), this is "consistent with a historical formulation of the Jewish people as descending from ancient Israelites". Approximately 35% to 43% of Jewish men are in the paternal line known as haplogroup J and its sub-haplogroups. This haplogroup is particularly present in the Middle East, North Africa, Horn of Africa, Caucasus, as well as in Southern Europe. 15% to 30% are in haplogroup E1b1b (or E-M35). Studies of mitochondrial DNA of Jewish populations are more recent, debatable, and more heterogeneous.

In a genetic study of Y-chromosomal STRs in two populations from Israel and the Palestinian Authority Area: Christian and Muslim Palestinians showed genetic differences. The majority of Palestinian Christians (31.82%) were a subclade of E1b1b, followed by G2a (11.36%), and J1 (9.09%). The majority of Palestinian Muslims were haplogroup J1 (37.82%) followed by E1b1b (19.33%), and T (5.88%). The study sample consisted of 44 Palestinian Christians and 119 Palestinian Muslims.

In 2004, a team of geneticists from Stanford University, the Hebrew University of Jerusalem, Tartu University (Estonia), Barzilai Medical Center (Ashkelon, Israel), and the Assaf Harofeh Medical Center (Zerifin, Israel), studied the modern Samaritan ethnic community living in Israel in comparison with modern Israeli populations to explore the ancient genetic history of these people groups. Their findings reported on four family lineages among the Samaritans: the Tsdaka, Joshua-Marhiv, Danfi, and the Cohen family. All Samaritan families were found in haplogroups J1 and J2, except the Cohen family which was found in haplogroup E3b1a-M78. This article predated the E3b1a subclades based on the research of Cruciani, et al.

In a 2005 study of ASPM gene variants, Mekel-Bobrov et al. found that the Israeli Druze people of the Carmel region have among the highest rate of the newly evolved ASPM haplogroup D, at 52.2% occurrence of the approximately 6,000-year-old allele. While it is not yet known exactly what selective advantage is provided by this gene variant, the haplogroup D allele is thought to be positively selected in populations and to confer some substantial advantage that has caused its frequency to rapidly increase.
According to DNA testing, Druze are remarkable for the high frequency (35%) of males who carry the Y-chromosomal haplogroup L, which is otherwise uncommon in the Middle East. This haplogroup originates from prehistoric South Asia and has spread from Pakistan into southern Iran.

Lebanon 

In a 2011 genetic study by Haber et al which analyzed the male-line Y-chromosome genetics of the different religious groups of Lebanon, revealed no noticeable or significant genetic differentiation between the Maronites, Greek Orthodox Christians, Greek Catholic Christians, Sunni Muslims, Shia Muslims, and Druze of the region on the more frequent haplogroups. Major differences between Lebanese groups were found among the less frequent haplogroups. In a 2013 interview Pierre Zalloua, pointed out that genetic variation preceded religious variation and divisions: "Lebanon already had well-differentiated communities with their own genetic peculiarities, but not significant differences, and religions came as layers of paint on top". In a 2007 study, geneticist Pierre Zalloua found that the genetic marker which identifies descendants of the ancient Phoenicians is found among members of all of Lebanon's religious communities. 

A 2013 genetic study carried out by Haber at al found that Jews (Sephardi and Ashkenazi) cluster in one branch, Druze from Mount Lebanon and Druze from Mount Carmel are depicted on a private branch, and Lebanese Christians form a private branch with the Christian populations of Armenia and Cyprus. Lebanese Muslims cluster towards the Muslim populations of Syrians, Palestinians, and Jordanians, which in turn cluster on branches with other Muslim populations as distant as Morocco and Yemen. The authors explained that "In particular, conversion of the region's populations to Islam appears to have introduced major rearrangements in populations' relations through admixture with culturally similar but geographically remote populations, leading to genetic similarities between remarkably distant populations like Jordanians, Moroccans, and Yemenis. Conversely, Christians and Druze became genetically isolated in the new cultural environment". In conclusion, the authors reconstructed the genetic structure of ancient Levantines and found that a pre-Islamic expansion Levant was more genetically similar to Europeans than to Arabians. 

A 2017 study published by the American Journal of Human Genetics, concluded that present-day Lebanese derive most of their ancestry from a Canaanite-related population (Canaanite being a pre-Phoenician name), which therefore implies substantial genetic continuity in the Levant since at least the Bronze Age. Geneticist Chris Tyler-Smith and his colleagues at the Sanger Institute in Britain compared "sampled ancient DNA from five Canaanite people who lived 3,750 and 3,650 years ago" to modern people; the comparison revealed that 93 percent of the genetic ancestry of people in Lebanon come from the Canaanites, and the other 7 percent is of a Eurasian steppe population.  

A 2019 study carried out by the Wellcome Sanger Institute analyzed the remains of nine Crusaders found at a burial site in Lebanon, and concluded that "contrary to the popular belief, the Crusaders did not leave a lasting effect on the genetics of Lebanese Christians." Instead, according to the study, today’s Lebanese Christians are "more genetically similar to locals from the Roman period, which preceded the Crusades by more than four centuries." A study by Makhoul et al on Beta Thalassemia Heterogeneity in Lebanon found out that the thalassemia mutations in some Lebanese Christians are similar to the ones observed in Macedonia, which "may confirm the ancient Macedonian origin of certain Lebanese Christians".

According to a 2020 study published in the American Journal of Human Genetics, there is substantial genetic continuity in Lebanon and the Levant of 91–67% since the Bronze Age (3300–1200 BC) interrupted by three significant admixture events during the Iron Age, Hellenistic, and Ottoman period, each contributing 3%–11% of non-local ancestry to the admixed population. The admixtures were postulated to be related to Sea Peoples, Central/South Asians and Ottoman Turks respectively.

Turkey 

Turkish genomic variation, along with several other Western Asian populations, looks most similar to genomic variation of South European populations such as Southern Italians. Data from ancient DNA – covering the Paleolithic, the Neolithic, and the Bronze Age periods – showed that Western Asian genomes, including Turkish ones, have been greatly influenced by early agricultural populations in the area; later population movements, such as those of Turkic speakers, also contributed. The first and only (as of 2017) whole genome sequencing study in Turkey was done in 2014. Moreover, the genetic variation of various populations in Central Asia "has been poorly characterized"; Western Asian populations may also be "closely related to populations in the east". An earlier 2011 review had suggested that "small-scale, irregular punctuated migration events" caused changes in language and culture "among Anatolia's diverse autochthonous inhabitants," which explains Anatolian populations' profile today.

See also 

Biblical terminology for race
Caucasus hunter-gatherer
Early human migrations
Ethnic groups in the Middle East
Genetic history of Europe
Genetic history of North Africa
Genetic studies on Arabs
History of the Middle East
Middle Bronze Age migrations (ancient Near East)
Middle Eastern studies
Near Eastern bioarchaeology
Y-DNA haplogroups in populations of the Near East

References

Bibliography

 
 
 
Zalloua, P., Wells, S. (2004) "Who Were the Phoenicians?" National Geographic Magazine, October 2004.

Middle East
Ancient peoples of the Near East
Archaeology of the Near East
Demographics of the Middle East
Middle East
History of the Middle East
Middle East
Middle Eastern studies
Middle East
Middle East
Middle East